The Gurgel Itaipu E150 is an electric car, produced by the Brazilian automobile manufacturer Gurgel. The Itaipu was presented at the Salão do Automóvel in 1974, with an intended production start in December 1975. Only a few of these cars were produced and is today a collector's item. While about twenty pre-series cars were built, it was never commercialized. It was the first electric car built in Latin America, and, its specifications were comparable to similar models of the time (see CitiCar). The car was named after the  hydro-electric dam and power plant on the border of Brazil and Paraguay.

The car's design was unique, a very compact trapezoidal two-seater. The car itself weighed a mere , with the remaining  consisting of batteries. The name "Itaipu" was brought back for a larger commercial vehicle in 1980, called the Itaipu E400. This was based on the Volkswagen-engined Gurgel G800.

References

Itaipu
Electric car models
Electric city cars
Cars introduced in 1975